Alborada (English: The Dawning) is a Mexican telenovela produced by Carla Estrada for Televisa in 2005. It is an historical drama, set in colonial Panama and Mexico a few years before Mexican Independence from Spain.

On Monday, October 24, 2005, Canal de las Estrellas started broadcasting Alborada weekdays at 9:00pm, replacing La esposa virgen. The last episode was broadcast on Friday, February 24, 2006 with La verdad oculta replacing it on Monday, February 27, 2006.

The series stars Lucero, Fernando Colunga, Daniela Romo, Luis Roberto Guzmán, Arturo Peniche, Ernesto Laguardia, Irán Castillo and Valentino Lanús.

Plot
Maria Hipólita Díaz is a young woman who lives in Panama with her husband, Antonio, and her mother-in-law, Adelaida. Antonio suffered from sexual abuses when he was a child, so he isn't able to consummate his marriage.

Adelaida wants to have a grandchild, as Antonio will not inherit the fortune of his uncle, Próspero, unless he sires a son.

Luis Manrique y Arellano is a noble Mexican who came to Santa Rita to close a deal under orders from his cousin Diego, the Count of Guevara, without knowing that the trip was a pretext to have him killed.

When Luis is captured by Adelaida's servants while fleeing from justice, she orders him to take Antonio's place in Hipólita's bed, or she'll turn him over to the authorities.

So Luis goes to Hipólita's bedroom, intending to escape from a window. It's very dark, she awakes upon hearing him try to escape, she doesn't see him very well and she believes he is her husband.

He makes love to her to keep her quiet, and then makes good his escape. But before he leaves, Hipólita discovers that this man isn't her husband, but an escaped prisoner.

Luis departs, without Hipólita seeing his face or knowing his name – but Luis knows hers. She is furious with her mother-in-law for what she has done, but she can't change what happened.

Some weeks later, Hipólta finds out that she is pregnant with Luis's child, so she decides to leave home with her maid, Adalgisa, and go to Mexico, where her family lives.

There, she has her child, Rafael, and finds her mother and her sister, but they aren't very thrilled to see her. Hipólita was Asunción's illegitimate daughter, so she sent the girl to Panama to be raised by her grandmother, so that no one in Mexico could know that she had a daughter outside of wedlock.

When Hipólita arrives in Mexico, she has to fight against her stepfather's hate and her mother's desperation when she finds out that there's another bastard in the family.

Luis also lives in Mexico: he is a rich man, cousin of the count of Guevara, and there is much mystery about his relationship with his mother, Juana, who appears to hate her own son and support the count against him at every turn.

Hipólita and Luis meet again and, although she doesn't recognize him, he recognizes her and he suspects that the child that Hipólita has with her is also his son.

They don't get on very well initially, but later, they fall in love with each other. Luis feels that he has to tell her that he is her son's father, but he can't do this, because if he did, Hipólita would hate him.

The eventual recognition of Rafael as Luis's son, the reason why Luis's mother detests him, and the plots of the Count of Guevara against Luis are played out against the background of Luis's and Hipólita's attempts to be together.

Cast

Main cast
Lucero as Doña María Hipólita de Corsa Díaz Montero de Guzmán / Doña María Hipólita de Corsa Díaz Montero de Manrique y Arellano
Fernando Colunga as Don Luis Manrique y Arellano, the real Count of Guevara
Daniela Romo as Doña Juana Arellano vda. de Manrique
Arturo Peniche as Don Antonio de Guzmán y Pantoja
Ernesto Laguardia as Don Cristóbal de Lara Montemayor y Robles
Irán Castillo as Doña Catalina Escobar Díaz Montero / Doña Catalina Escobar Díaz Montero de Lara
Valentino Lanus as Martín Alvarado Solares

Supporting cast
 
Alejandro Tommasi as Don Felipe Alvarado Solares
Manuel Ojeda as Don Francisco Escobar
Olivia Bucio as Doña Asunción Díaz Montero de Escobar
Luis Roberto Guzmán as Don Diego Arellano y Mendoza
Vanessa Guzmán as Perla Lopéz
Zully Montero as Doña Adelaida Pantoja vda. de Guzmán
Mariana Karr as Doña Isabel Manrique de Leiva
Mariana Garza as Doña Esperanza Carmona de Corsa de Manrique
Robertha as Paula
Sherlyn as Marina Sandoval Mancera y Oviedo de Valdés de Escóbar 
Monica Miguel as Modesta
Gilberto de Anda as Amílcares Gasca
Beatriz Moreno as Adalgisa "Ada" Sánchez
José Luis Reséndez as Andrés Escobar y Fuenterilla
Patricia Martínez as Doña Carmela Solares de Alvarado
Archie Lafranco as Don Rodrigo de Rivera
Arturo Vázquez as Ramón Fuentes
Lucero Lander as Sister Teresa de Lara Montemayor y Robles
Analia del Mar as Mirtha
Marcelo Córdoba as Marcos López
Susana Lozano as Bernarda
Gabriel de Cervantes as Lázaro
Rudy Casanova as Fermín
Edgardo Eliezer as Vicente
Benjamín Pineda as Aurelio
María Rojo as Doña Victoria Mancera y Oviedo vda. de Valdés
Aurora Clavel as Cleotilde
Rosa María Bianchi as Doña Magdalena de Iturbe y Pedroza
Magda Guzmán as Doña Sara de Oviedo "The Mighty One"
Lupita Lara as Rosario
Humberto Dupeyrón as Don Próspero de Guzmán
Rubén Cerda as Brother Gaspar
Isaura Espinoza as Eusebia
Justo Martínez as Brother Álvaro D'Acosta
Mario Iván Martínez as Singer in the brothel
David Ostrosky as Don Agustín de Corsa
Jan as Don Santiago de Corsa
Eduardo Liñán as Captain Nicolás Pardo
Julio Monterde as Archbishop
Aarón Hernán as Don Anselmo Iturbe y Pedroza
Adalberto Parra as Higinio
Carlos Girón as Cirilo
Alexander Renaud as Rafael Luis Diaz Montero Manrique y Arellano
Rebeca Manríquez as Elvira Sandoval
Cristina Pastor as Doña Eloísa Iturralde
Raúl Valerio as Don Malaquías Apodaca
Antonio Medellín as Brother Pablo
Magda Karina as Doña Sara de Oviedo (young)
Joana Brito as Landlady
Amparo Garrido as Hipólita's employer
María Dolores Oliva as María
Benjamín Islas as Don Eliseo Ulloa

Awards and nominations

International Broadcasters of Alborada 

North & South America, Caribbean
 

Europe, Africa, Asia, Oceania

References

External links

 at esmas.com 
Alborada at univision.com 

2005 telenovelas
Mexican telenovelas
2005 Mexican television series debuts
2006 Mexican television series endings
Spanish-language telenovelas
Television shows set in Mexico City
Televisa telenovelas